Ochyrotica toxopeusi is a moth of the family Pterophoridae. It is known from New Guinea, Sulawesi and Irian Jaya.

References

External links
Papua Insects

Moths described in 1988
Ochyroticinae